is a passenger railway station located in the city of Fukaya, Saitama, Japan, operated by the private railway operator Chichibu Railway.

Lines
It is also served by through services to and from the Seibu Chichibu Line.

Station layout
The station is staffed and consists of one side platform (platform 1) and one island platform serving three tracks in total. Track 3 is a bidirectional freight loop not normally used by passenger services. Access between the platforms is via a crossing at track level.

Platforms

Adjacent stations

History
Omaeda Station opened on 7 October 1901.

Passenger statistics
In fiscal 2018, the station was used by an average of 1098 passengers daily.

Surrounding area
 
 Hanazono Junior High School
 Hanazono Elementary School

See also
 List of railway stations in Japan

References

External links

  

Railway stations in Japan opened in 1901
Railway stations in Saitama Prefecture
Stations of Chichibu Railway
Fukaya, Saitama